Guillaume Cailleau (born 15 February 1978 in Saumur) is a French artist and filmmaker.

Biography 
From 2006 to 2011 Guillaume Cailleau studied at the Berlin University of the Arts and was a postgraduate student under Heinz Emigholz. Before his art studies he graduated as an engineer from Icam in Nantes. He also worked as a cinema projectionist in Paris and Berlin.

In 2007 Guillaume Cailleau shot his first short film Blitzkrieg, which premiered at the International Short Film Festival Oberhausen. Other films followed, such as Through, a reference to Michael Snow's installation Windowed Water (2007), the manually processed film H(I)J (2009), and Austerity Measures (2012), a collaboration with Ben Russell shot in Athens. In February 2014 Guillaume Cailleau was awarded a Silver Bear for his short film Laborat at the Berlinale Film Festival.
Since 2009 Guillaume Cailleau has been a member of the independent film collective LaborBerlin. As a freelance video artist, he has worked in theater productions by Thomas Ostermeier, Hakan Savaş Mican und Mala Kline. In addition Cailleau developed numerous audiovisual performances, for instance with the experimental sound artist Werner Dafeldecker and the composer and conductor Timo Kreuser which were featured at international venues such as the Edinburgh International Film Festival (2014), Scratch Expanded Paris (2013) and COLOR SOUND FRAMES (2015) at Serralves Museum.

Cailleau is co-producer of Ben Russell's Film "Good Luck" (2017), which premiered at the Locarno Festival and was shown as a 4-channel video installation at documenta 14 in Kassel.

Style 
Guillaume Cailleau's work is influenced by American avant-garde cinema and performative practices in Expanded Cinema. Experimenting with duration, multiple exposures, color separation and manually treated single images, in addition to other methods of image editing, the forms of his films relate directly to their subjects. The process of filmmaking is often foregrounded in the artist's poetic compositions.

Filmography (selection) 
 2007: Blitzkrieg (short film, Premiere 54. International Short Film Festival Oberhausen)
 2008: Through; with Benjamin Krieg (short film, Premiere 59. Berlinale, Forum Expanded)
 2009: H(I)J (short film, Premiere NYFF 2009, Views from the Avant-Garde)
 2012: Austerity Measures; with Ben Russell (Premiere 62. Berlinale, Forum Expanded)
 2013: Abdou's Dread in Teatro Argentina, Roma (short film, Premiere Edinburgh International Film Festival 2013)
 2014: Laborat (short film, Premiere 64. Berlinale, Short Film Competition)
 2014: Hanging (Premiere Kienzle Art Foundation) 
 2016: Organ Movement_For Elmer Kussiac_ (music video, Premiere 62. International Short Film Festival Oberhausen)

Installations (selection) 
 2010: Un nuage, Temps Organiques, MIRE cinéma expérimental & image en mouvement, Nantes 2012
 2010: Creative Commons, CONTACT, Royal Ontario Museum Toronto
 2011: Flowed, Dada Post, Berlin
 2012: Lucile's Ghost on Atlas Top, Bruxelles, Rencontres internationales Paris/Berlin
 2013: WILD WILD, mit Hanna Slak, Doppeltes Berlin, Haus der Kulturen der Welt, Berlin

Performances (selection) 
 2013 #2.0x, with Jan Slak, Scratch Expanded Paris  
 2015 Resonator II, with Werner Dafeldecker, Serralves Museum
 2015 Resonator III, with Werner Dafeldecker und Splitter Orchester, Akademie der Künste Berlin, Musik für alle
 2015 Compound Interest, with Timo Kreuser, Figura Festspiele 2015, Copenhagen
 2016 Exchange Rates, with Timo Kreuser, Biegungen, Ausland Berlin

Awards 
 2014: Silver Bear Prize of the Jury, 64. Berlinale for Laborat
 2015: Jury Award Flexfest 2015 for Laborat
 2016: 2nd Prize, 62. International Short Film Festival Oberhausen for Organ Movement_For Elmer Kussiac_

References

External links 
 
 Guillaume Cailleau on the Experimental Cinema Database
 Films by Guillaume Cailleau on rental at Lightcone Paris 
 Films by Guillaume Cailleau on rental at arsenal Berlin
 Homepage of Laborat by Guillaume Cailleau
 Performances von Guillaume Cailleau on Vimeo
 Interview with Guillaume Cailleau, Short Talks, 64. Berlinale 2014
 Text on works by Guillaume Cailleau

French artists
French filmmakers
1978 births
Living people
People from Saumur
Berlin University of the Arts alumni